The 2008 All-Ireland Minor Football Championship was the 77th staging of the All-Ireland Minor Football Championship, the Gaelic Athletic Association's premier inter-county Gaelic football tournament for boys under the age of 18.

Galway entered the championship as defending champions, however, they were defeated by Roscommon in the Connacht semi-final.

On 27 September 2008, Tyrone won the championship following a 1-20 to 1-15 defeat of Mayo in a replay of the All-Ireland final. This was their seventh All-Ireland title overall and their first title in four championship seasons.

Results

Connacht Minor Football Championship
Rod-Robin

Semi-finals

Final

Leinster Minor Football Championship
Preliminary round

Quarter-finals

Semi-finals

Final

Munster Minor Football Championship
Rob-Robin

Semi-finals

Final

Ulster Minor Football Championship

Rob-Robin

Quarter-finals

Semi-finals

Final

All-Ireland Minor Football Championship

Quarter-finals

Semi-finals

Final

References

2008
All-Ireland Minor Football Championship